James Ernest McLaughlin (18 October 1873 – 17 February 1966) was a Canadian-American architect active primarily in Boston, Massachusetts, and the surrounding area from about 1905 through the 1950s. He designed Fenway Park—home stadium of the Boston Red Sox baseball team—among many other buildings in Massachusetts. Early in his career, McLaughlin collaborated on some designs with his maternal uncle and fellow architect James Mulcahy. From 1920 onward, McLaughlin was partnered with architect George Houston Burr under the name McLaughlin and Burr.

Early life
McLaughlin was born on 18 October 1873 (some sources say 1874 or 1875) in Halifax, Nova Scotia, Canada. His father James McLaughlin (1837–1907) was a born Nova Scotian of English and Scottish descent, while his mother Mary Mulcahy McLaughlin (1848–1929) was born in Ireland. 

In 1885, at the age of 12, McLaughlin immigrated to Boston. It is likely he came to the United States with his parents, as they were buried in Massachusetts when they died. On 4 April 1908, he married Mary Josephine Ratigan (1874–1934) in Boston. Her parents were Thomas Ratigan and Ellen Heany. James and Mary's son, James Ernest McLaughlin, Jr., was born in 1912.

Professional career
The 1893 Boston Directory listed McLaughlin as a draftsman working at 43 Milk Street in Boston and boarding in Everett, Massachusetts. He began practicing as an architect around 1905. In 1912, McLaughlin designed the now-iconic Fenway Park, home stadium of the Boston Red Sox. Some of his other early projects include Massachusetts Army National Guard armories in the central Massachusetts towns of Hingham, Hudson, Natick, and Newton. McLaughlin collaborated on the armory projects with his maternal uncle and fellow architect James Mulcahy; it is not clear whether they were formal business partners. In 1916, a year after Mulcahy's death, McLaughlin designed the Commonwealth Armory in Boston.

In 1914 a certain George Houston Burr started working for McLaughlin as a draftsman, becoming an architect in his own right in 1915. In 1920 the two men formed a partnership under the name McLaughlin and Burr. The architectural firm of McLaughlin and Burr remained active into the 1950s, designing multiple residential, commercial, and public buildings (including many schools) throughout Massachusetts.

Later life
McLaughlin was a longtime resident of the Chestnut Hill neighborhood of Brookline, Massachusetts. He lived at the 326 Reservoir Road home he designed in 1914. 

He died on 17 February 1966 at his home. He is buried at Saint Joseph Cemetery in West Roxbury, Massachusetts.

Works
This is a partial list.

Individual
Benedict Fenwick School, Boston
Commonwealth Armory, Boston
Fenway Park, Boston

With James Mulcahy
Hingham Armory, Hingham
Hudson Armory, Hudson
Natick Armory, Natick
Newton Armory, Newton

As McLaughlin and Burr
65 Commonwealth Avenue, Boston
Boston Latin School, Boston
Dorchester High School, Dorchester
Hotel Bradford (former Elks Hotel), Boston
Mary E. Curley School, Jamaica Plain
South Boston Police Station (District 6), Boston
Temple Israel Meeting House, Boston

References

1873 births
1966 deaths
Architects from Boston
20th-century American architects
20th-century Canadian architects
Sports venue architects